The Reflection is a Japanese anime co-created by writer Stan Lee and director Hiroshi Nagahama. Music is by Trevor Horn, with 9nine singing the end titles song. A Blu-ray disc was released in 2018. Crunchyroll co-produced and licensed the anime in September 2017 with Funimation handling the English dub.

Plot
Some years previously, a mysterious event called The Reflection gave superpowers to various individuals.

Characters
X-On

X-On has the ability to absorb powers from Reflected, but is not one himself.
I-Guy (Ian Izette)

Izette had a hit with the song "Sky Show" and the Reflection has now given him a superpowered voice that he combines with a supersuit.
Eleanor Evans

Eleanor is a journalist who can teleport over short distances.
Lisa Livingston

A wheelchair-using teenager, Lisa is able to transform into a giant robot powered by her imagination.
Michael Holden

Blinded by the event, able only to see other Reflected.
Vy Le

Michael's wife, transformed into a Darkness Reflected.
Wraith/Ethan Evans

Leader of the Darkness Reflected. Has the ability to project into Eleanor's mind so only she can see him.
Steel Ruler

Able to manipulate metal.
Mr. Mystic

The creator appears in his own story as a villain.
Flaming Fury

A Darkness Reflected who can manipulate fire.
Volt Vortex

A Darkness Reflected who can manipulate electricity.
Dead Wing 

A Darkness Reflected who has the appearance and abilities of a bat.
Con Man 

A Darkness Reflected with the power to cause others to hallucinate.
Thru

A Darkness Reflected with the power to pass herself and others through solid objects.
Deborah

A government agent investigating the Reflected.
Jim

A friend of X-On with a scarred face.
Clarence

A military officer investigating the Reflected.
Aaron

Ian's long time friend and leader of I-Guy's support crew.
Jay, Tim, and Enrico

I-Guy's support crew.
Ninth Wonder/9nine

A quartet of Japanese schoolgirls Reflected.

Soundtrack
A 21-track soundtrack album, The Reflection Wave One—Original Soundtrack, by Trevor Horn was released in Japan and (digitally only) the US and UK. A limited edition version in Japan adds 3 bonus tracks. These are also available as the b-side to a digital single, "Sky Show", released in the US and UK.

The end theme, "SunSunSunrise", is sung by 9nine, produced and co-written by Horn, co-composed by Simon Bloor and Cameron Gower Poole, and with lyrics by Kohei Tsunami.

References

External links
 Official Site 
 
 

2017 anime television series debuts
Action anime and manga
Anime with original screenplays
Crunchyroll anime
Funimation
Superheroes in anime and manga
Studio Deen
Television shows based on works by Stan Lee